Chodov may refer to places in the Czech Republic:

Chodov (Sokolov District), a town in the Karlovy Vary Region
Chodov (Karlovy Vary District), a municipality and village in the Karlovy Vary Region
Chodov (Domažlice District), a municipality and village in the Plzeň Region
Chodov (Prague), a suburb of Prague
Chodov (Prague Metro), metro station in Prague
Zadní Chodov, a municipality and village in the Plzeň Region